Ptyas fusca, commonly known as the white-bellied rat snake or brown rat snake, is a species of colubrid snake. It is found in Indonesia, Brunei, Malaysia, Thailand and Singapore.

The white-bellied rat snake prefers forested habitats. They are known to prey on frogs and lizards and fish. It is known to remain still and hold neck erect when disturbed-a threatening posture.

The adults range from brown to brick-red colour on the upper surface. Ventral scales are white to pale yellowish in colour. Thick black stripes on either side of the posterior body and tail is a characteristic feature. Juveniles often greenish in coloration. The pupil is rounded and large.

References

External links
 Photo by Hock Ping GUEK - Selangor, Malaysia
 Photo by Paul - Maliau Basin, Sabah, Malaysia

Colubrids
Reptiles of Thailand
Reptiles of Indonesia
Reptiles of Malaysia
Reptiles of Brunei
Taxa named by Albert Günther
Reptiles described in 1858
Reptiles of Borneo